The Keio Challenger is a professional tennis tournament played on hardcourts. It is currently part of the ATP Challenger Tour and the ITF Women's Circuit. Having been held in Yokohama, Japan since 1999. In 2015, Taro Daniel won the men's singles title, defeating Go Soeda in the final  4–6 , 6–3 , 6–3.

Seeds

Draw

Finals

Top half

Bottom half

References
 Main Draw
 Qualifying Draw

2015 ATP Challenger Tour
Keio Challenger
2015 Keio Challenger